Jalal Malaksha (1951 – 31 October 2020) was a Kurdish poet, writer, political activist, translator and journalist from Eastern Kurdistan, Iran.

Career
He wrote poetry in Kurdish (Sorani) and Persian, and his poems have been translated into several languages. Malaksha is considered one of the important Kurdish poets of the late 20th century in Iran. He was born in Malekshan-e Olya, Kurdistan Province, and died in Sanandaj, aged 69. Malaksha was well known during his lifetime. In 2015 a gathering that was planned to be held in commemoration of his works was cancelled by Iranian police in Sanandaj.

References 

1951 births
2020 deaths
Kurdish poets
People from Sanandaj